Kurt "Kutti" Weiß (30 March 1906 – 29 May 1995) was a German field hockey player who competed in the 1936 Summer Olympics.

He was a member of the German field hockey team, which won the silver medal. He played three matches as forward and he was the only player to score against India in the tournament.

In 1928 he was a squad member of the German field hockey team, but he did not compete.

References

External links
 
profile

1906 births
1995 deaths
German male field hockey players
Olympic field hockey players of Germany
Field hockey players at the 1936 Summer Olympics
Olympic silver medalists for Germany
Olympic medalists in field hockey
Medalists at the 1936 Summer Olympics
20th-century German people